Melpignano is a small town and comune in the province of Lecce in Apulia, Italy. It is one of the nine towns of Grecìa Salentina.

There are 84 industrial firms employing 474 people who are the 60,69% of the total of the workers. There are 50 service firms employing 165 people who are the 21,13% of the total of the workers. There are also 39 firms employing 89 people who are the 11,40% of the total of the workers. There are also 23 administrative offices employing 53 workers who are the 6,79% of the total of the workers.

The people of Melpignano, alongside Italian, also speak Griko, a Greek dialect. The language, folklore, traditions and history of Calimera, like those of the eight other cities in the area called "Salentine Greece", reveal significant Greek influences over the course of time, presumably from the time of the Byzantine control, or even the ancient Magna Graecia colonisation in the 8th century BCE.

References

Grecìa Salentina
Localities of Salento